Rosanova Glacier is a glacier about  long flowing north from King Peninsula into the Abbot Ice Shelf. Named by Advisory Committee on Antarctic Names (US-ACAN) after Christine E. Rosanova, United States Geological Survey (USGS), Flagstaff, AZ; specialist in the use of satellite imagery for geological and glaciological studies from the early 1990s to 2002; a pioneer in the use of imagery for glacier velocity measurements.

See also
 List of glaciers in the Antarctic
 Glaciology

References
 

Glaciers of Thurston Island